Rembert is an extinct town in south central Wright County, in the Ozarks of southern Missouri. The site is approximately two miles west-southwest of Hartville and north of Missouri Route 38 and the Woods Fork of the Gasconade River.

A post office called Rembert was established in 1904, and remained in operation until 1915. The community has the name of the local Rembert family.

References

Ghost towns in Missouri
Former populated places in Wright County, Missouri